Princess Elizabeth of Yugoslavia (born 7 April 1936) is a member of the royal House of Karađorđević, a human rights activist and a former presidential candidate for Serbia. Yugoslavia abolished its monarchy in 1945 and decades later broke up into several countries.

Biography
Princess Elizabeth was born in the White Palace, Belgrade as the third child and the only daughter of Prince Paul of Yugoslavia (prince regent of Yugoslavia 1934–1941) and Princess Olga of Greece and Denmark. Her older brothers were Prince Nicholas and Prince Alexander of Yugoslavia, who married, firstly, Princess Maria Pia of Savoy and, secondly, Princess Barbara of Liechtenstein. She is a paternal second cousin of Queen Sofía of Spain and King Charles III, and a maternal first cousin of Prince Edward, Duke of Kent and his siblings, Prince Michael of Kent and Princess Alexandra, The Honourable Lady Ogilvy. She is also a maternal third cousin of king Willem-Alexander of the Netherlands. She is a great-great-granddaughter of Karađorđe, who started the first Serbian uprising against the Turks in 1804.

Her godmother and namesake was her maternal aunt Princess Elizabeth of Greece and Denmark.

A businesswoman and writer, she is the author of four storybooks for children and she has created two perfumes- "Jelisaveta" and "E". Permanently settled in Belgrade, she lived in Villa "Montenegrina", which was owned by her mother, Princess Olga, the wife of Prince Regent Paul. The Villa has been recently sold off by the Princess.

Education
Princess Elizabeth was educated in Kenya, the United Kingdom and Switzerland, finally she studied the history of fine art in Paris. She speaks English, French, Spanish, Italian and Serbian.

Personal life
Princess Elizabeth was married to Howard Oxenberg (1919–2010), an American Jewish dress manufacturer and close friend of the Kennedy family. He was the grandson of Alexander Balfour. They married on 21 January 1961 and were divorced in 1966. They have two daughters (and three granddaughters):

Catherine Oxenberg (b. 22 September 1961) briefly married Robert Evans in July 1998 and had the marriage annulled nine days later. She married Casper Van Dien on 8 May 1999. They had two daughters and divorced in 2015. She also has a daughter, born in 1991, from a previous relationship.
India Riven Oxenberg (b. 7 June 1991)
Maya Van Dien (b. 20 Sep 2001) 
Celeste Alma Van Dien (b. 3 Oct 2003)
Christina Oxenberg (b. 27 December 1962) married Damian Elwes in May 1986. They later divorced.

Princess Elizabeth's second marriage was to Neil Balfour of Dawyck (born 1944) on 23 September 1969 and they divorced in November 1978. They have one son (and four granddaughters):

Nicholas Augustus Roxburgh Balfour (b. 6 June 1970) married Jonkvrouw Stéphanie de Brouwer (b. 1971) in 2000. They have four daughters:
India Lily Balfour (b. 17 October 2002)
Gloria Elizabeth Balfour (b. 11 November 2005)
Olympia Rose Balfour (b. 27 June 2007)
Georgia Veronika Stefania Balfour (b. 10 September 2010)

In 1974, she was briefly engaged to the actor Richard Burton, after his first divorce from Elizabeth Taylor.

Princess Elizabeth married a third time, to former Prime Minister of Peru Manuel Ulloa Elías (1922–1992) on 28 February 1987. They separated in 1989, although the marriage was never officially dissolved. In 1992 Ulloa Elías died, which made the princess officially a widow.

Property status
After the death of King Alexander I, and during the Regency administration (of Regent Prince Paul, Radenko Stanković and Ivo Perović) that followed, the City of Belgrade District Court issued Decree N° 0.428/34 on 27 October 1938.  The decree, which became official law on 4 March 1939, pronounced King Alexander I's underage sons King Peter II, Prince Tomislav and Prince Andrew, in equal parts, heirs to his entire estate.  This included all real estate at Dedinje: the Royal Palace (Old Palace) in Belgrade, its surrounding land and forest, and the White Palace, with its appertaining houses. On 2 August 1947, Edvard Kardelj, then vice president of the Socialist Federal Republic of Yugoslavia, issued a decree that confiscated all these properties from the royal Karadjordjević family.  This followed an earlier decree in March 1947, stripping the family of their citizenship.

His decree, the 'National Assembly of the Presidency of the People's Federal Republic of Yugoslavia,' was abolished in 2001 after the deposing of Slobodan Milošević. The new government of Yugoslavia restored to all members of the royal family both their citizenship and the use of the entire royal complex in Dedinje. In 2013, it was announced that the villa "Crnogorka" (Montenegrin), in Uzička Street, Dedinje, was to be returned to Princess Elizabeth. The villa was bought by Princess Olga in 1940, and taken by the state in 1947. It was owned by the Serbian government and used as the official residence of the Ambassador of Montenegro.

Politics
Princess Elizabeth recognized early the dangerous signs that would turn the former Yugoslavia upside down in a bloodbath of historic religious and ethnic rivalries long suppressed by Communist rule. She spoke out in Europe and America on behalf of bridging the gap between ethnic hatreds. Working behind the scenes through United Nations programs, she also journeyed to the Vatican in 1989 to ask Monsignor Tauran, then Holy See Secretary for Relations with States, to help improve relations between Catholic and Orthodox communities in Yugoslavia.

In December 1990, she created the Princess Elizabeth Foundation, a non-political, not-for-profit organization after foreseeing the crucial importance of a vehicle to address the tension brewing just below the surface. Since the subsequent civil wars, her efforts have focused heavily on transporting medical supplies, food, clothing and blankets to refugee camps, in addition to finding homes for children victimized by war and placing older students in schools and colleges in America.

Before the breakup of Yugoslavia began in 1991, she invited the Orthodox Bishop Sava and the Mufti of Belgrade, along with the Yugoslav Minister for Religious Affairs to attend a conference in Moscow that was hosted by Mikhail Gorbachev.  This was the second international gathering of political and religious leaders committed to world reform that included Mother Teresa, the Archbishop of Canterbury, the Dalai Lama, Al Gore and Carl Sagan.

 

She decided to run for President of Serbia in the 2004 Serbian presidential election, despite her cousin Alexander's having objected that the Royal Family should stay out of politics. After the end of World War II, the Royal Family was banished from the country, and their goods confiscated. "In case of victory," she stated, "my priority would not be to return to a monarchy, but to form a real State." She got 63,991 votes or 2.1%, finishing in 6th place out of fifteen candidates.

In 2002, Princess Elizabeth received the first Nuclear Disarmament Forum Award, the Demiurgus Peace International, (accompanying president Vladimir Putin, Archbishop Desmond Tutu, Ted Turner and others) for outstanding achievements in the field of strengthening peace among nations in Zug, Switzerland.

Arms

Princess Elizabeth was granted heraldic arms on 20 June 2008. Her motto translates into English as Service Is Love In Action.

Honours 
  Grand Patron of the Order of the Fleur of Lys (United Kingdom).
  Dame Grand Cordon of the Royal and Hashemite Order of the Pearl (Sultanate of Sulu).

Ancestry

See also
Politics of Serbia
2004 Serbian presidential elections
Prince Paul of Yugoslavia

References

1936 births
Karađorđević dynasty
Living people
People from Belgrade
People from New York (state)
Yugoslav princesses
Serbian princesses
Candidates for President of Serbia
Serbian human rights activists
Yugoslav human rights activists
Yugoslav people of Russian descent
Serbian people of Russian descent
Serbian people of Finnish descent
Serbian people of Swedish descent
Serbian people of Greek descent
Serbian people of German descent
Serbian people of Danish descent
Former United States citizens